Spodnji Stari Grad is a settlement on the left bank of the Sava River in the Municipality of Krško in eastern Slovenia. The area is part of the traditional region of Styria. It is now included with the rest of the municipality in the Lower Sava Statistical Region.

References

External links
Spodnji Stari Grad on Geopedia

Populated places in the Municipality of Krško